Romain Rocchi (born 2 October 1981, in Cavaillon) is a French former professional footballer of Italian descent. He played as a midfielder.

Honours
Paris Saint-Germain
Coupe de France: 2003–04

References

External links

1981 births
Living people
French people of Italian descent
People from Cavaillon
Sportspeople from Vaucluse
Association football midfielders
Expatriate footballers in Israel
French footballers
AS Cannes players
Paris Saint-Germain F.C. players
SC Bastia players
AC Ajaccio players
FC Metz players
AC Arlésien players
Ligue 1 players
Ligue 2 players
Israeli Premier League players
Hapoel Tel Aviv F.C. players
Footballers from Provence-Alpes-Côte d'Azur